North County Cricket Club is a cricket club in Balrothery, County Dublin, Ireland, playing in Division 1 of the Leinster Senior League.

The club was established in 1985 by the merger of Balrothery and Man O'War cricket clubs. North County is Ireland's most successful cricket club with 5 all Ireland titles.

Irish Senior Cup: 5
2001, 2003, 2005, 2007, 2008
Leinster Senior League: 5
2003, 2004, 2005, 2006, 2010
Leinster Senior Cup: 1
2003

Facilities 
The impressive facilities at North County Cricket Club include Ireland's only purpose-built Centre of Excellence indoor training centre that is used by both the men's and ladies Ireland cricket teams as well as International and Provincial sides.

Overseas professionals 
The club regularly welcomes overseas professionals at the club.  In 2018 Malcolm Nofal represented the club before returning to New Zealand.  In 2019 Yassar Cook represented the club before returning to South Africa.

Teams fielded 
In 2019 North County Cricket Club fielded 4 men's teams and 7 junior teams.  The junior section comprised both boys and girls teams.

Notable players 

Eoin Morgan - England Captain
Eddie Richardson - Ireland cricket team

References

External links
North County Cricket Club

Cricket clubs in County Dublin
Leinster Senior League (cricket) teams
1985 establishments in Ireland
Sports clubs in Fingal
Cricket clubs established in 1985